Taeniotes scalatus  is a species of flat-faced longhorn beetle in the subfamily Lamiinae of the family Cerambycidae.

Description
Basic color of body is black, with a yellow dorsal streak and small spots. Larval host plants are cultivated figs (Ficus carica), Artocarpus altilis, Artocarpus integrifolia, Brosimum utile, Castilla elastica, Morus alba and Coffea arabica. These nocturnal flat-faced longhorn beetles can be found all year round, especially from March to June.

Distribution
This species is very common and widely distributed in the Azores, in the Nearctic realm, in Mexico, and in Central America and northern South America (Belize, Bolivia, Costa Rica, Colombia, Ecuador, Guatemala, Honduras, Nicaragua, Panama and Venezuela).

Bibliography
 Miguel A. Monné (2005): Catalogue of the Cerambycidae (Coleoptera) of the Neotropical Region. Part II. Subfamily Lamiinae
 Tavakilian, G. and  Chevillotte, H. (2012) Titan: base de données internationales sur les Cerambycidae ou Longicornes.

References

External links
 Encyclopaedia of Life
 Manual of dangerous insects

scalatus
Beetles described in 1790
Beetles of Central America
Fauna of the Azores
Taxa named by Johann Friedrich Gmelin